FLOCERT  is one of the world’s leading social auditing and verification bodies and the global certifier for Fairtrade. With a vision of combating poverty and securing sustainable livelihoods for farmers in developing countries, FLOCERT's focus lies on auditing global supply chains and guaranteeing compliance with Fairtrade Standards.

The headquarters are located in Bonn, Germany. Furthermore, there are regional offices in Cape Town, Bangalore, San José, London and Washington,  D.C..

History 
FLOCERT was born out of the Fairtrade movement. The Fairtrade movement began in the late 1980s, when Max Havelaar, the world's first fair trade coffee brand, made its way onto the shelves of a Dutch supermarket. The next few years saw fair trade labels spring up across Europe and North America, until the umbrella organisation Fairtrade International (known back then as Fairtrade Labelling Organisations International or FLO) was established to unite the rapidly growing movement. In 1997 Fairtrade International began setting out its global standard for fairly traded products, and certifying the producers that made up fair trade supply chains. As the initiative grew, Fairtrade International decided that in order to ensure the certification system was consistently independent and credible, the standard setting side of the organisation should be separated from the arm that assesses and verifies its producers. Thus, FLOCERT was founded in 2003 as a subsidiary of Fairtrade International to act independently of the standard-setting side of the organisation. Since 2003, FLOCERT has been independently verifying that all companies involved in Fairtrade supply chains are meeting and maintaining Fairtrade standards. Today, FLOCERT also provides other assurance solutions and impact measurements services.

Assurance Services

Fairtrade Certification 
Fairtrade is one of the world’s best-known and most successful standards for improving ethical performance across supply chains. It promotes better prices, decent working conditions, local sustainability and fair terms of trade for farmers and workers in the developing world. FLOCERT's role in this is to certifies all elements of the supply chain – from farming or production of raw materials, all the way to final packaging. To do this, FLOCERT auditors visit organisations to assess whether they meet the Fairtrade Standards.

Other Schemes and Customised Assurance 
Although Fairtrade Certification is at the core of what FLOCERT does, FLOCERT also offers combined audits by collaborating with other schemes and programs that share its own goals and beliefs, and other customised assurance solutions.

Accreditations 
Since 2007, FLOCERT has ISO 17065 accreditation, the international standard for ensuring fair and capable certification of products, processes and services. To be accredited FLOCERT is regularly audited by the German National Accreditation body DAkkS.

References

External links 
 FLOCERT
 IRFT India

Fair trade organizations
Organisations based in Bonn
Organizations established in 2003